Jonathan Richard Arthur Townsend (born 30 November 1942) is a former first-class cricketer who played for Oxford University in 1964 and 1965.

Jonathan Townsend was educated at Winchester College before going up to Corpus Christi College, Oxford. A batsman, he played a few matches for Oxford without gaining a Blue. His highest score was 64, batting at number three against the touring Australians in 1964, when he was "the only University batsman to show any confidence in the first innings", and no one else in his team made more than 34.

Townsend also played 20 games of Minor Counties cricket between 1964 and 1975 for Durham, Wiltshire and Suffolk. His grandfather Charlie Townsend and his father David Townsend played Test cricket for England.

References

External links
 

1942 births
Living people
People educated at Winchester College
Alumni of Corpus Christi College, Oxford
English cricketers
Oxford University cricketers
Durham cricketers
Wiltshire cricketers
Suffolk cricketers